The Clovis Independent was an American newspaper founded in 1919 that ceased its publication in 2008,  under its last editor, Patti J. Lippertt. It served Clovis, California and Fresno County. The end of the Clovis was part of a larger cost-cutting effort by The McClatchy Company, which resulted in layoffs across many McClatchy papers, including the Fresno Bee and Sacramento Bee.

History 
The Clovis Independent was established in 1919 by S.S. Case and May Case. May had built a reputation as a reporter in Purcell, Oklahoma at the Register. Though May and her husband Spurgeon sold the paper to Myron A. Hinkley in 1939. May continued to work for the paper until her death, at the age of 93, in 1967. In 1967, May Case was known as the "oldest working newspaperwoman in the United States." In 1964, at age 90, May Case won the award of "Newspaper Girl of the Year" at the California Press Women's annual meeting. She also received a citation from the U.S. Treasury Department for purchasing U.S. Treasury bonds and for inspiring others to purchase these bonds. May Case bought the first bonds made available to the public, but never cashed them. October 8 was designated as May Case Day in Clovis.

An explosion and resulting fire destroyed the Clovis Independent's building and printing machinery in 1930. Subsequently, Clovis Independent merged with the Tribune in 1944, which was further sold by Mr. and Mrs. Myron Hinkley to Anthony Turano in 1959. In 1968, Russ Mazzei, owner/operator of the Clovis Free Press, purchased the Clovis Independent and merged the two papers under the Clovis Independent name. In 1968, Clovis Independent was the paper of record for the city of Clovis, and the lengthy legal battle between the Independent's owner and the Free Press' owner over the designation status in the city of Clovis resulted in the merging of the two papers. Mazzei later sued the Fresno County District Attorney and a police officer for an alleged violation of his civil rights. Russ Mazei accused the District Attorney of using the power of his office against Clovis Free Press, aiming to start a competing newspaper. Mazzei was sued for a libel by the police officer in 1983, and lost. Mazzei was also the founder of the Clovis Hall of Fame, honor “the old timers of Clovis,” which he founded in 1975.

Clovis Independent was acquired by McClatchy in 1979. In 1996, the paper's publisher, Earl Wright Jr., arranged for the football team of the town of Clovis, CA to play the football team from the town of Clovis, NM. The demise of the Clovis Independent was cited as the reason for the creation of the Clovis Roundup.

Awards 
The newspaper placed second in in-depth reporting category in the California Newspaper Publishers Association's annual Better Newspapers Contest in 1987. It won first place for sports coverage and first-place sports story in 2005.

References

1919 establishments in California
2008 disestablishments in California
Defunct newspapers published in California
McClatchy publications
Mass media in Fresno County, California
Newspapers established in 1919
Publications disestablished in 2008
San Joaquin Valley